ADM2 is a protein that in humans is encoded by the ADM2 gene.

ADM2 belongs to a family of calcitonin (MIM 114130)-related peptide hormones important for regulating diverse physiologic functions and the chemical composition of fluids and tissues.[supplied by OMIM]

References

External links

Further reading